Michele Azzola (born 26 August 1954) is an Italian wrestler. He competed in the men's freestyle 90 kg at the 1984 Summer Olympics.

References

External links
 

1954 births
Living people
Italian male sport wrestlers
Olympic wrestlers of Italy
Wrestlers at the 1984 Summer Olympics
People from Gemona del Friuli
Sportspeople from Friuli-Venezia Giulia
20th-century Italian people